Alconchel is a Spanish municipality in the province of Badajoz, Extremadura. It has a population of 1,970 (2007) and an area of 294.9 km².

References

External links
Official website 

 auto

Municipalities in the Province of Badajoz